Saral-e Olya (also Romanized as Sārāl-e ‘Olyā; also known as Sārāl-e Bālā) is a Kurdish village in Almahdi Rural District, Mohammadyar District, Naqadeh County, West Azerbaijan Province, Iran. At the 2006 census, its population was 186, in 39 families.

References 

Populated places in Naqadeh County